The Roman Catholic Diocese of Zrenjanin (Latin: Dioecesis Zrenjanensis,  / , ,) is an ecclesiastical territory or diocese of the Roman Catholic Church in Serbia. It is subject to the Roman Catholic Archdiocese of Belgrade. The Diocese is centered in the city of Zrenjanin.

Territory
The Diocese of Zrenjanin encompasses the Serbian part of the Banat region, which is mostly situated in the Autonomous Province of Vojvodina (the small part of the area administratively belongs to the City of Belgrade).

The diocese's cathedral is the Cathedral of Saint John of Nepomuk in Zrenjanin, which was built in 1868.

The diocese is multi-ethnic and has members primarily from the sizable Hungarian and Croat communities, as well as Bulgarians, Czechs, Slovaks, and Germans.

History
Until the end of First World War, the territory of the present-day Diocese of Zrenjanin belonged to the Roman Catholic Diocese of Csanád. After the collapse of Austria-Hungary, region of Western Banat was incorporated into newly formed Kingdom of Serbs, Croats and Slovenes (later known as Yugoslavia). In 1923, the Apostolic Administration of Yugoslav Banat was created. First apostolic administrator was Ivan Rafael Rodić. In 1924, he was appointed first Roman Catholic Archbishop of Belgrade, continuing to serve also as apostolic administrator of Yugoslav Banat. Until the end of Second World War, the largest number of Roman Catholics in the territory of Yugoslav Banat was of German ethnicity. In 1986, apostolic administration was reorganized into "Diocese of Zrenjanin" and placed under metropolitan jurisdiction of Roman Catholic Archbishop of Belgrade.

Administrators and bishops
 1923–1936 Ivan Rafael Rodić
 1936–1961 Josip Ujčić
 1961–1971 Gabrijel Bukatko
 1971–1988 Tamás Jung (bishop since 1986)
 1988–2007 László Huzsvár
 2007–present László Nemet

See also
Roman Catholic Church in Serbia
Roman Catholic Diocese of Subotica
Roman Catholic Diocese of Syrmia

External links
Bishopric of Zrenjanin

Banat
Zrenjanin
Zrenjanin
Zrenjanin